The 2004 Toronto Grand Prix of Mosport was an American Le Mans Series professional sports car race held at Mosport International Raceway near Bowmanville, Ontario, Canada from August 6 to the 8, 2004. It was the sixth race of the 2004 American Le Mans Series season and the 19th IMSA sanctioned sports car race held at the facility.

Race

The LMP1 and overall race victory went to Dyson Racing drivers Butch Leitzinger and James Weaver for their first victory of the season in the MG-Lola EX257.  After winning the previous four rounds, ADT Champion Racing drivers Marco Werner and JJ Lehto finished second in the Audi R8, with the second Dyson Racing entry of Chris Dyson and Andy Wallace finishing third.

The GTS class win went to Corvette Racing's Oliver Gavin and Olivier Beretta in the Chevrolet Corvette C5-R, with Intersport Racing's Clint Field and Robin Liddell taking the LMP2 victory in the Lola B2K/40.  Alex Job Racing drivers Jörg Bergmeister and Timo Bernhard won the GT class in a Porsche 911 GT3-RSR.

The race was broadcast across North America on CBS Sports with Ralph Sheheen and Bill Adam calling the race.

Official results

Class winners in bold.  Cars failing to complete 70% of winner's distance marked as Not Classified (NC).

Statistics
 Pole Position - #16 Dyson Racing - 1:07.430
 Fastest Lap - #16 Dyson Racing - 1:09.088
 Distance - 
 Average Speed -

References

External links
 2004 Grand Prix of Mosport Race Broadcast (American Le Mans Series YouTube Channel)

Mosport
Grand Prix of Mosport
Mosport